Tyrell Zimmerman (Born February 23, 1985) is an American author. He is the author of the children's book titled Carter: My Dream, My Reality which is published through Mascot Books. The foreword of this book was given by American television, film, and stage actor and director, Blair Underwood. Zimmerman is a former professional American football defensive lineman. Zimmerman attended and played football for Northwestern State University before transferring to Pace University. Tyrell was a 2010 NFL Draft prospect and was selected to play in the 2010 Valero Cactus Bowl. After exploring various professional playing opportunities, which included the NFL, CFL, and AFL, Tyrell focused on working with and advocating for disadvantaged and at-risk youth. Currently, Tyrell is also nationally known and respected for his work within the sports & entertainment industry.

Carter: My Dream, My Reality 
Carter: My Dream, My Reality is a children's book that is used a s a tool and a great starting point for children and adults to have guided discussions that foster healing and recovery from traumatic experiences. "Carter: My Dream, My reality", is centered around violence & trauma, childhood PTSD, and mental health, particularly in the Black & African-American community.

Tyrell Zimmerman Mental Health & Wellness through Literacy Program

Program overview 
The Tyrell Zimmerman Mental Health & Wellness through Literacy program at DuBois Integrity Academy was designed to meet the mental health and trauma needs of under-served children through literacy. Through a careful culturally sensitive lens, the program emphasizes work with specific groups where there is a lack of access to information, resources, education, funding, and care. The program is specifically structured to integrate current & former NFL players as guest readers to the children who are enrolled in the program. Under the careful supervision and instruction of educators and certified mental health professionals. Children are provided a meal at the program as well as a hot meal to take home for dinner. Children are also given the opportunity to participate in a physical activity, receive homework help, participate in an enrichment activity, and have reading time with current & former NFL players. The program consist of a progressive curriculum that provides a therapeutic setting and engages the child while fostering healing and recovery from traumatic experiences in a safe, fun, and loving environment.

References

External links
NFL Draft Scout Profile
http://www.northeast10.org/sports/fball/2009-10/news/20100104-CactusBowl
https://www.barnesandnoble.com/w/carter-tyrell-zimmerman/1128728558
https://books.google.com/books/about/Carter.html?id=8GwMtwEACAAJ
http://www.booksamillion.com/product/9781631777103
https://www.indiebound.org/book/9781631777103
https://www.news-daily.com/features/dubois-integrity-academy-teams-up-with-tyrell-zimmerman-nfl-to/article_427f5d5a-c6eb-5de0-aa65-307a772d0963.html
https://www.duboisintegrityacademy.org/

1985 births
Living people
Northwestern State Demons football players
Pace Setters football players
Billings Outlaws players
Trenton Steel players
Tulsa Talons players
Columbus Lions players